The 2001 Calder Cup playoffs of the American Hockey League began on April 10, 2001. The sixteen teams that qualified, eight from each conference, played best-of-five series for division semifinals and best-of-seven series for division finals and conference finals.  The conference champions played a best-of-seven series for the Calder Cup. The Calder Cup Final ended on May 28, 2001, with the Saint John Flames defeating the Wilkes-Barre/Scranton Penguins four games to two to win the first, and only, Calder Cup in team history.

Saint John's Steve Begin won the Jack A. Butterfield Trophy as AHL playoff MVP. Wilkes-Barre Scranton defenseman Chris Kelleher set an AHL playoff record for points scored by a defenseman in one playoff with 25 (7 goals, 18 assists). This record was broken in 2008 by Wilkes-Barre/Scranton defenseman Alex Goligoski.

Playoff seeds
After the 2000–01 AHL regular season, 16 teams qualified for the playoffs. The top four teams from each division qualified for the playoffs. However, due to the uneven number of teams in each division, it was possible for teams to crossover to another division for the playoffs. The fifth-placed team in the New England Division could qualify for the fourth playoff spot in the Canadian Division if they earned more points than the fourth-placed team in the Canadian Division. The fifth-placed team in the Mid-Atlantic Division could qualify for the fourth playoff spot in the South Division if they earned more points than the fourth-placed team in the South Division. The Worcester IceCats were the Eastern Conference regular season champions as well as the Macgregor Kilpatrick Trophy winners with the best overall regular season record. The Rochester Americans were the Western Conference regular season champions.

Eastern Conference

Canadian Division
Saint John Flames – 100 points
Quebec Citadelles – 89 points
St. John's Maple Leafs – 80 points

New England Division
Worcester IceCats – Eastern Conference regular season champions; Macgregor Kilpatrick Trophy winners, 108 points
Hartford Wolf Pack – 94 points
Providence Bruins – 84 points
Lowell Lock Monsters – 80 points
Portland Pirates – 74 points (Played in the Canadian Division bracket by virtue of earning more points than the fourth-placed team in that division)

Western Conference

Mid-Atlantic Division
Rochester Americans – Western Conference regular season champions, 104 points
Syracuse Crunch – 83 points
Wilkes-Barre/Scranton Penguins – 83 points
Philadelphia Phantoms – 82 points
Hershey Bears – 75 points (Played in the South Division bracket by virtue of earning more points than the fourth-placed team in that division)

Southern Division
Kentucky Thoroughblades – 97 points
Cincinnati Mighty Ducks – 95 points
Norfolk Admirals – 90 points

Bracket

In each round the team that earned more points during the regular season receives home ice advantage, meaning they receive the "extra" game on home-ice if the series reaches the maximum number of games. There is no set series format due to arena scheduling conflicts and travel considerations.

Division Semifinals
Note 1: All times are in Eastern Time (UTC−4).
Note 2: Game times in italics signify games to be played only if necessary.
Note 3: Home team is listed first.

Eastern Conference

Canadian Division

(C1) Saint John Flames vs. (N5) Portland Pirates

(C2) Quebec Citadelles vs. (C3) St. John's Maple Leafs

New England Division

(N1) Worcester IceCats vs. (N4) Lowell Lock Monsters

(N2) Hartford Wolf Pack vs. (N3) Providence Bruins

Western Conference

Mid-Atlantic Division

(M1) Rochester Americans vs. (M4) Philadelphia Phantoms

(M2) Wilkes-Barre/Scranton Penguins vs. (M3) Syracuse Crunch

Southern Division

(S1) Kentucky Thoroughblades vs. (M5) Hershey Bears

(S2) Cincinnati Mighty Ducks vs. (S3) Norfolk Admirals

1 – at Cincinnati Gardens
2 – at Norfolk, Virginia

Division Finals

Eastern Conference

Canadian Division

(C1) Saint John Flames vs. (C2) Quebec Citadelles

New England Division

(N1) Worcester IceCats vs. (N3) Providence Bruins

Western Conference

Mid-Atlantic Division

(M2) Wilkes-Barre/Scranton Penguins vs. (M4) Philadelphia Phantoms

Southern Division

(S3) Norfolk Admirals vs. (M5) Hershey Bears

Conference finals

Eastern Conference

(C1) Saint John Flames vs. (N3) Providence Bruins

Western Conference

(M2) Wilkes-Barre/Scranton Penguins vs. (M5) Hershey Bears

Calder Cup Final

(C1) Saint John Flames vs. (M2) Wilkes-Barre/Scranton Penguins

See also
2000–01 AHL season
List of AHL seasons

References

Calder Cup playoffs
Calder Cup